The 2010 ADAC GT Masters season was the fourth season of the ADAC GT Masters, the grand tourer-style sports car racing founded by the German automobile club ADAC. It began on 10 April at Motorsport Arena Oschersleben and finished on 3 October at the same place after seven double-header meetings. Peter Kox and Albert von Thurn & Taxis became the first drivers in this series to share the championship title.

Entry list

Race calendar and results

Standings

References

External links
 
 ADAC GT Masters on RacingSportCars
 2010 ADAC GT Masters season on Speedsport Magazine

ADAC GT Masters season
ADAC GT Masters seasons